Ponmudi (the Golden Peak) also known as Ooty of South Kerala, Kashmir of Kerala is a hill station in the Peringamala gramapanchayath  of Trivandrum District of Kerala in India. Ponmudi (Varayadumotta) peak is a part of the Western Ghats mountain range that runs parallel to the Arabian Sea. Ponmudi is a popular honeymoon destination in South India.

Attractions
Ponmudi is connected to Trivandrum by a two-lane highway (SH2 & SH 45).  The last 18 km starting from Anapara has scenic views, as it winds through the mountains and tea gardens. The travel along this stretch provides a thrilling experience as drivers and riders have to navigate 22 Hairpin turns.   Ponmudi is also a popular spot for backpacking and trekking. The climate is pleasant year-round.

Other attractions near Ponmudi include Golden Valley and a number of rivulets and rapids, some even across the road. The lush forest area has tropical vegetation. A variety of wildlife inhabit the hills. The Golden Valley offers vistas of the hills and access to the Kallar River. Flowing through a wilderness area, it has rounded pebbles, cool water, fish, and lush green trees.

Some notable tourist attractions located in Ponmudi are Peppara Wildlife Sanctuary, Echo Point and various trekking spots. Mist-laden valleys, especially Golden Valley near Kallar River, also draw tourists. Travelers can find a deer park and wood and stone cottages coloured in bright hues. Located about 1.5 km from the hill station, is the Ponmudi Falls. Around 3 km from the Ponmudi Resort, is the Deer Park. The Meenmutty Falls, another tourist attraction of the region, is about 3 km from the Kallar Main Road. Peppara Wildlife Sanctuary, located on the outskirts of Ponmudi, is a preserve spread across  and accommodates a variety of wild animals and birds like Asian elephants, sambar, leopards, lion-tailed macaques, Malabar grey hornbills, etc.

Another main attraction in the region is Agasthyarkoodam, one of the highest peaks in the Western Ghats, with the highest peak at 1868 m. This peak is known for its wilderness, and can be accessed only with the Forest Department's permission. Agasthyamalai Biosphere Reserve is another attraction covering Neyyar, Peppara, Shendurney Wildlife Sanctuaries and divisions of Achencoil, Thenmala, Konni, Punalur, and Thiruvananthapuram

Ecology
The landscape of Ponmudi is an interspersing of valleys and hills with forestland and plantations. Ponmudi is having an extensive importance of biodiversity, which plays a major role in maintaining the ecological balance of the area.
Ponmudi is host to 283 species of birds, many of which are endangered and threatened. Birds endemic to this region include the painted bush quail, the Malabar grey hornbill, the Wayanad laughingthrush, the broad-tailed grass bird and the Nilgiri pipit. The grasslands of Ponmudi are the breeding grounds of the broad-tailed grass bird, a threatened species. Fifty-nine per cent of the 483 bird species in Kerala are found at Ponmudi. Of the 16 species of birds endemic to the Western Ghats, 15 are at Ponmudi. Of the 332 species of butterflies in the Western Ghats, 195 are found here. Of the 37 butterfly species endemic to the Ghats, 24 are found at Ponmudi. The spot puffin, a rare butterfly, has been sighted at the Kulachikarai-Panayam-Merchiston area where ISRO's land comes.  Similarly, Ponmudi is also host to many species of reptiles and amphibians, including the highly endangered Travancore tortoise, the Malabar Gliding Frog and the Malabar tree toad. Nilgiri tahr is also found in Ponmudi hill top.

Kallar and Menmutty Falls

Kallar situated en route to the hill station of Ponmudi, Kallar gets its name from the River Kallar, which flows through the region. Kallu means 'stone' and Aru means 'river', hence the name Kallar. The river is well known for its abundance of attractive, round-shaped boulders and pebbles, especially in the upper reaches and middle portion of its course. Here one can take a dip in the crystal clear waters to cool off, and also watch the many rapids and small pools that dot a good part of the river in this area.

Meenmutty Falls, Thiruvananthapuram is one of the main attractions located nearby Ponmudi hills and is around 45 km from Thiruvananthapuram. This waterfall is about 3 km away from the Kallar-Ponmudi road. The main attractions are waterfalls and the small natural pools and rocks located beside the way to the waterfalls. In order to reach the place, one has to take a long trek that passes through dense forests, upon taking special permission from the Forest Department. A guide will be sent along with tourist groups to the falls. Facilities for trekking are easily provided at Kallar Vana Samrakshana Samithi, which is a forest protection group at Kallar.

Gallery

Transport

Road transport
 Ponmudi hill station is well connected to Thiruvananthapuram and Kerala by a wide network of roads. Buses ply from the main bus stand in Trivandrum and VITHURA at periodic intervals. Taxis are available from the Central Station at Trivandrum and Airport.

Rail
 Nearest railway station is Thiruvananthapuram Central railway station.

Air
 Nearest airport is Thiruvananthapuram International Airport.

See also

 Western Ghats - Ponmudi is a part of Western Ghats
 Anamudi (ആനമുടി) - Highest peak in Kerala
 Agastya Mala (അഗസ്ത്യമല) - Highest peak in Kerala south of the Cardamom Hills
 Nedumangad - Nedumangad Taluk (Wikipedia)
 Nedumangad  - Nedumangad Taluk

References 

More about Ponmudi

External links 

https://www.youtube.com/watch?v=S2qdiybXW_s

 Ponmudi - Kerala Tourism

Kerala Hill Stations

Hill stations in Kerala
Populated places in the Western Ghats
Mountains of the Western Ghats
Mountains of Kerala
Tourist attractions in Thiruvananthapuram district
Geography of Thiruvananthapuram district